Succinea ceylanica is a species of air-breathing land snails, terrestrial pulmonate gastropod mollusks in the family Succineidae.

Distribution
It is endemic to Sri Lanka.

References

External links

Succineidae
Gastropods described in 1855